Ernst I, Duke of Saxe-Altenburg (German: Ernst I. Friedrich Paul Georg Nikolaus von Sachsen-Altenburg) (16 September 1826 in Hildburghausen – 7 February 1908 in Altenburg), was a duke of Saxe-Altenburg. He was the first son of Georg, Duke of Saxe-Altenburg and Marie Luise of Mecklenburg-Schwerin. In 1853 he succeeded his father as Duke of Saxe-Altenburg. He was of a retiring disposition and he took little active part in running the country. After a reign that lasted fifty five years, he died without a living direct male heir; because of this, he was succeeded by his nephew, Ernst.

Marriage
He was married in Dessau on 28 April 1853 to Agnes of Anhalt-Dessau (1824–1897). Agnes was a sister of Friedrich I, Duke of Anhalt.

They had two children:
 Marie (b. Eisenberg, 2 August 1854 – d. Camenz, 8 October 1898), married on 19 April 1873 to Albrecht of Prussia.
 Georg (b. Altenburg, 1 February 1856 – d. Altenburg, 29 February 1856).

Honours and decorations
German honours

Foreign honours
 : Grand Cross of St. Stephen, 1859
 : Grand Cordon of the Royal Order of Leopold
 : Knight of the Elephant, 28 October 1882
 : Grand Cross of the Netherlands Lion
 : Order of Osmanieh, 1st Class in Diamonds
 : Grand Cross of the Star of Romania
 :
 Knight of St. Andrew
 Knight of St. George, 4th Class
 : Grand Cross of the Cross of Takovo
   Sweden-Norway: Knight of the Seraphim, 24 February 1864
  Grand Duchy of Tuscany: Grand Cross of the Military Order of St. Stephen

Ancestry

References

1826 births
1908 deaths
Colonel generals of Saxony
Dukes of Saxe-Altenburg
People from Hildburghausen
Colonel generals of Prussia
19th-century Prussian military personnel
Grand Crosses of the Order of Saint Stephen of Hungary
Recipients of the Order of St. George of the Fourth Degree
Recipients of the Order of the Netherlands Lion
Grand Crosses of the Order of the Star of Romania
Recipients of the Order of the Cross of Takovo